In mathematics, more precisely in functional analysis, an energetic space is, intuitively, a subspace of a given real Hilbert space equipped with a new "energetic" inner product. The motivation for the name comes from physics, as in many physical problems the energy of a system can be expressed in terms of the energetic inner product. An example of this will be given later in the article.

Energetic space
Formally, consider a real Hilbert space  with the inner product  and the norm .

  for all  in 
  for some constant  and all  in 

The energetic inner product is defined as 
 for all  in 
and the energetic norm is
 for all  in 

The set  together with the energetic inner product is a pre-Hilbert space.

 

Energetic extension
The operator  admits an energetic extension  

 for all  in 

by the definition of the energetic inner product.

An example from physics

Consider a string whose endpoints are fixed at two points  on the real line   (here viewed as a horizontal line). Let the vertical outer force density at each point   on the string be , where   is a unit vector pointing vertically and  Let  be the deflection of the string at the point  under the influence of the force. Assuming that the deflection is small, the elastic energy of the string is 

 

and the total potential energy of the string is

 

The deflection  minimizing the potential energy will satisfy the differential equation

 

with boundary conditions

To study this equation, consider the space  that is, the Lp space of all square-integrable functions  in respect to the Lebesgue measure. This space is Hilbert in respect to the inner product

 

with the norm being given by 

 

Let  be the set of all twice continuously differentiable functions  with the boundary conditions  Then  is a linear subspace of 

Consider the operator  given by the formula

 

so the deflection satisfies the equation  Using  integration by parts and the boundary conditions, one can see that 

 

 is also strongly monotone, since, by the Friedrichs's inequality 

 

for some 

The energetic space in respect to the operator  is then the Sobolev space  We see that the elastic energy of the string which motivated this study is 

 

To calculate the deflection  minimizing the total potential energy  of the string, one writes this problem in the form 

For example, one might let  be a continuous piecewise linear function in the energetic space, which gives the finite element method. The approximation  can be computed by solving a system of linear equations.

See also
 Inner product space
 Positive-definite kernel

References

Functional analysis
Hilbert space